Robert's shaggy rat (Dasymys robertsii) is a species of rodent in the genus Dasymys that lives in South Africa. It was described in 2004.

References
Mullin, SK, Taylor, PJ & Pillay, N. 2004. Skull size and shape of Dasymys (Rodentia, Muridae) from sub-Saharan Africa. Mammalia 68 (2-3) :185-220.
Verheyen, W., Hulselmans, JLJ, Dierckx, T., Colyn, M., Leirs, H. & Verheyen, E. 2003. A craniometric and genetic approach to the systematics of the genus Dasymys Peters, 1875 and the description of three new taxa (Rodentia, Muridae, Africa). Bulletin of the Royal Belgian Institute of Natural Sciences 73:27-71.

Dasymys
Mammals described in 2004